Tehseen Fawad is a Pakistani politician who was a Member of the Provincial Assembly of the Punjab, from May 2013 to May 2018.

Early and personal life 
She was born on 13 November 1959 in Lahore.

She is married and has five children.

She is a social worker by profession and had been Executive Member of Aurat Foundation in 1998.

Political career

She had been a Member of the Rawal Town Tehsil from 2005 to 2008 and Member of Bait-ul-Maal Rawalpindi District from 2011 to 2013.

She was elected to the Provincial Assembly of the Punjab as a candidate of Pakistan Muslim League (N) on a reserved seat for women in 2013 general election.

References

Living people
Punjab MPAs 2013–2018
1959 births
Pakistan Muslim League (N) politicians